Maël Lebrun (born April 17, 1991) is a French professional basketball player who plays for French Pro A league club STB Le Havre.

References

1991 births
Living people
French men's basketball players
Orléans Loiret Basket players
Sportspeople from Nice
STB Le Havre players
Small forwards
Shooting guards
Black French sportspeople